Argon is a chemical element with symbol Ar and atomic number 18.

Argon may also refer to:

Computing
Argon, a family of Soviet computers
Argon, the codename of the first AMD Athlon core
Argon, an Augmented Reality browser from Georgia Tech
Argon, a 3-D modeling software package from Ashlar-Vellum
Argon2, a cryptographic key derivation function

Fiction
Argons, the main antagonists in the game TERA: Rising
Argon, a faction in the X game series

Other uses
Argon (1908 automobile), a defunct British automobile
Argon (clothing), Indian garment
Argon, a codename used for the KH-5 Argon reconnaissance satellite
Argon people, of the Ladakh region in the Indian state of Jammu and Kashmir
Arghun, a.k.a. Argon ( – 1291), the fourth ruler of the Mongol empire's Ilkhanate
Ali Argon, American engineer
Argon (TV series), 2017 South Korean TV series
Argon (band), South Korean boy band

See also

Aragon (disambiguation)
Argonne (disambiguation)
Argonaut (disambiguation)
AR (disambiguation)
Ergon (disambiguation)
Orgon